Bellur Chandrashekharaiah Nagesh is an Indian politician who is the current Minister of School Education and Literacy & Sakala   of Karnataka since 04 August 2021. He is a two times Member of Karnataka Legislative Assembly from Tiptur.

Early life and education
Nagesh was born in Tumkur district. He attained Bachelors of Engineering from B.M.S. College of Engineering and was part of the Akhil Bharatiya Vidyarthi Parishad (ABVP) during his student days. 

Parents: B S Chandrashekaraiah & BC Savithramma

Political career

He started off his political career from the Rashtriya Swayamsevak Sangh and has been a full-time worker of the Sangh for several years. He joined the Bharatiya Janata Party in 1984. He is closely associated with B. L. Santhosh, the National General Secretary (Organisation) of the BJP.

Nagesh won the state assembly elections from Tiptur constituency in 2008 and 2018.

In 2021, he was inducted into the Basavaraj Bommai ministry and was made the Minister of Primary & Secondary Education.

References

Living people
State cabinet ministers of Karnataka
1959 births
Karnataka MLAs 2018–2023
Bharatiya Janata Party politicians from Karnataka